SEA LIFE Charlotte-Concord is an interactive aquarium located at Concord Mills in Concord, North Carolina, a suburb of Charlotte. The aquarium contains thousands of aquatic creatures, plus an interactive touch pool and an 180° ocean tunnel. SEA LIFE Charlotte-Concord is owned and operated by Merlin Entertainments.

Main species

{| class="wikitable"
|Nurse Shark
|Dog-Faced Puffer
|Chocolate Chip Sea Star
| Hermit Crab
| Angel Fish
| Blacktip Reef Shark

| Clown Trigger Fish
| Atlantic Ray
| Cownose Ray
| Jellyfish
| Clownfish
| Green Sea Turtles

| Lionfish
| Sea Star
| Cleaner Shrimp
| Yellow Tang Fish
| Blue Tang Fish

Conservation

SEA LIFE is involved with a number of conservation activities.

Seahorse breeding
SEA LIFE has successfully bred and reared nine species of seahorse, helping prevent the breeds from becoming extinct. This means that no seahorses will ever be taken from the wild for their exhibitions, and they may be able to resupply seahorses if they become extinct in the wild.

Seal rescues
SEA LIFE works with seal sanctuaries to care for orphaned and injured seal pups. Over 100 seals are successfully rescued and returned to the wild each year.

Re-homing
SEA LIFE provides permanent homes for injured or disabled aquatic creatures who would have otherwise been killed or euthanized.

Protection of turtles
A fundraising campaign run by SEA LIFE has enabled a new Sea Turtle Rescue and Wildlife Information Centre to be built on the Greek island of Zakynthos to treat turtles who have been injured in collisions with pleasure craft or entanglement in fishing gear.

References

Aquaria in North Carolina
Sea Life Centres
Concord, North Carolina
Buildings and structures in Cabarrus County, North Carolina
Tourist attractions in Cabarrus County, North Carolina